Sanidine is the high temperature form of potassium feldspar with a general formula K(AlSi3O8). Sanidine is found most typically in felsic volcanic rocks such as obsidian, rhyolite and trachyte. Sanidine crystallizes in the monoclinic crystal system. Orthoclase is a monoclinic polymorph stable at lower temperatures. At yet lower temperatures, microcline, a triclinic polymorph of potassium feldspar, is stable.

Due to the high temperature and rapid quenching, sanidine can contain more sodium in its structure than the two polymorphs that equilibrated at lower temperatures. Sanidine and high albite constitute a solid solution series with intermediate compositions termed anorthoclase. Exsolution of an albite phase does occur; resulting cryptoperthite can best be observed in electron microprobe images.

Occurrence
In addition to its presence in the groundmass of felsic rocks, sanidine is a common phenocryst in rhyolites and, to a lesser extent, rhyodacites. Trachyte consists largely of fine-grained sanidine. 

Fallout ash beds in sedimentary rock of the western United States have been classified in part by whether sanidine phenocrysts are present and, if present, whether they are sodium-enriched. W-type rhyolite ash beds contain sodium-poor sanidine; G-type rhyolite ash beds contain sodium-rich sanidine; and dacite fallout ash beds frequently lack sanidine. Because of their high potassium content, sanidine phenocrysts are also very useful for radiometric dating of rhyolite ash beds by the K-Ar method.

Composition
Although the ideal composition of sanidine is 64.76 wt% SiO2, 18.32 wt% AlsO3, and 16.72 wt% K2O, natural sanidine incorporates significant sodium, calcium, and ferric iron. Calcium and sodium substitute for potassium (with concurrent substitution of additional aluminum for silicon, in the case of calcium) while ferric iron substitutes for aluminum. A typical natural composition is:

At elevated temperature, a complete solid solution exists between sanidine and albite. Rapid cooling of the sanidine freezes the composition, though most sanidine is cryptoperthitic, showing separate layers of low-sodium sanidine and albite at a sub-micron scale that can be detected only by X-ray crystallography or electron microscope methods.

Order-disorder transitions
The crystal structure of ideal potassium feldspar has four sets of tetrahedral sites, each capable of accepting either an aluminum or a silicon ion. These are labeled the T1o, T1m, T2o, and T2m sites. In sanidine, the aluminum and silicon are distributed randomly among all four sites, and the T1o and T1m are mirror images of each other, as are the T2o and T2m sites. This produces a crystal with monoclinic symmetry. With slow cooling, the aluminum becomes concentrated in the T1 sites but remains randomly distributed between T1o and T1m sites. The resulting orthoclase crystal retains monoclinic symmetry but with different crystal axis lengths. Further cooling causes the aluminum to concentrate in the T1o sites, breaking the monoclinic symmetry and producing triclinic microcline. Each transition requires exchange of ions between tetrahedral sites, which takes place at measurable rates only at high temperature.

Sanidine and genesis of magmas
Pure sanidine melts incongruously at 1150 °C, yielding solid leucite and liquid. A mixture of sanidine with silica in the form of tridymite melts at a eutectic temperature of 990 °C, which defines the "granite" eutectic. The temperature at which granite begins to melt is lowered by several hundred degrees by the presence of water.

References

 Hurlbut, Cornelius S.; Klein, Cornelis, 1985, Manual of Mineralogy, 20th ed., Wiley, 

Feldspar
Monoclinic minerals
Minerals in space group 12